Albert Edward Matthews (1873–1949) was Lieutenant Governor of Ontario.

Albert Matthews may also refer to:
 Albert Matthews (cricketer), Scottish cricketer 
 Bruce Matthews (general) (Albert Bruce Matthews, 1909–1991)
 Edward Matthews (Australian soldier) (Albert Edward Matthews, 1896–1997)

See also
 Paul Siogvolk (1820–1903), real name Albert Mathews, American author, lawyer and editor
 A. G. Mathews (Albert G. Mathews, 1872–1958), Democratic president of the West Virginia Senate
 Al Matthews (disambiguation)